A landfill site, also known as a tip, dump, rubbish dump, garbage dump, or dumping ground, is a site for the disposal of waste materials. Landfill is the oldest and most common form of waste disposal, although the systematic burial of the waste with daily, intermediate and final covers only began in the 1940s. In the past, refuse was simply left in piles or thrown into pits; in archeology this is known as a midden.

Some landfill sites are used for waste management purposes, such as temporary storage, consolidation and transfer, or for various stages of processing waste material, such as sorting, treatment, or recycling. Unless they are stabilized, landfills may undergo severe shaking or soil liquefaction of the ground during an earthquake. Once full, the area over a landfill site may be reclaimed for other uses.

Operations

Operators of well-run landfills for non-hazardous waste meet predefined specifications by applying techniques to:

 confine waste to as small an area as possible
 compact waste to reduce volume

They can also cover waste (usually daily) with layers of soil or other types of material such as woodchips and fine particles.

During landfill operations, a scale or weighbridge may weigh waste collection vehicles on arrival and personnel may inspect loads for wastes that do not accord with the landfill's waste-acceptance criteria. Afterward, the waste collection vehicles use the existing road network on their way to the tipping face or working front, where they unload their contents. After loads are deposited, compactors or bulldozers can spread and compact the waste on the working face. Before leaving the landfill boundaries, the waste collection vehicles may pass through a wheel-cleaning facility. If necessary, they return to the weighbridge for re-weighing without their load. The weighing process can assemble statistics on the daily incoming waste tonnage, which databases can retain for record keeping. In addition to trucks, some landfills may have equipment to handle railroad containers. The use of "rail-haul" permits landfills to be located at more remote sites, without the problems associated with many truck trips.

Typically, in the working face, the compacted waste is covered with soil or alternative materials daily. Alternative waste-cover materials include chipped wood or other "green waste", several sprayed-on foam products, chemically "fixed" bio-solids, and temporary blankets. Blankets can be lifted into place at night and then removed the following day prior to waste placement. The space that is occupied daily by the compacted waste and the cover material is called a daily cell. Waste compaction is critical to extending the life of the landfill. Factors such as waste compressibility, waste-layer thickness and the number of passes of the compactor over the waste affect the waste densities.

Sanitary landfill life cycle

The term landfill is usually shorthand for a municipal landfill or sanitary landfill. These facilities were first introduced early in the 20th century, but gained wide use in the 1960s and 1970s, in an effort to eliminate open dumps and other "unsanitary" waste disposal practices. The sanitary landfill is an engineered facility that separates and confines waste.  Sanitary landfills are intended as biological reactors (bioreactors) in which microbes will break down complex organic waste into simpler, less toxic compounds over time. These reactors must be designed and operated according to regulatory standards and guidelines (See environmental engineering).

Usually, aerobic decomposition is the first stage by which wastes are broken down in a landfill. These are followed by four stages of anaerobic degradation. Usually, solid organic material in solid phase decays rapidly as larger organic molecules degrade into smaller molecules. These smaller organic molecules begin to dissolve and move to the liquid phase, followed by hydrolysis of these organic molecules, and the hydrolyzed compounds then undergo transformation and volatilization as carbon dioxide (CO2) and methane (CH4), with rest of the waste remaining in solid and liquid phases.

During the early phases, little material volume reaches the leachate, as the biodegradable organic matter of the waste undergoes a rapid decrease in volume. Meanwhile, the leachate's chemical oxygen demand increases with increasing concentrations of the more recalcitrant compounds compared to the more reactive compounds in the leachate. Successful conversion and stabilization of the waste depend on how well microbial populations function in syntrophy, i.e. an interaction of different populations to provide each other's nutritional needs.:

The life cycle of a municipal landfill undergoes five distinct phases:

Initial adjustment (Phase I)

As the waste is placed in the landfill, the void spaces contain high volumes of molecular oxygen (O2). With added and compacted wastes, the O2 content of the landfill bioreactor strata gradually decreases. Microbial populations grow, density increases. Aerobic biodegradation dominates, i.e. the primary electron acceptor is O2.

Transition (Phase II)

The O2 is rapidly degraded by the existing microbial populations. The decreasing O2 leads to less aerobic and more anaerobic conditions in the layers. The primary electron acceptors during transition are nitrates and sulphates since O2 is rapidly displaced by CO2 in the effluent gas.

Acid formation (Phase III)

Hydrolysis of the biodegradable fraction of the solid waste begins in the acid formation phase, which leads to rapid accumulation of volatile fatty acids (VFAs) in the leachate. The increased organic acid content decreases the leachate pH from approximately 7.5 to 5.6. During this phase, the decomposition intermediate compounds like the VFAs contribute much chemical oxygen demand (COD). Long-chain volatile organic acids (VOAs) are converted to acetic acid (C2H4O2), CO2, and hydrogen gas (H2). High concentrations of VFAs increase both the biochemical oxygen demand (BOD) and VOA concentrations, which initiates H2 production by fermentative bacteria, which stimulates the growth of H2-oxidizing bacteria. The H2 generation phase is relatively short because it is complete by the end of the acid formation phase. The increase in the biomass of acidogenic bacteria increases the amount of degradation of the waste material and consuming nutrients. Metals, which are generally more water-soluble at lower pH, may become more mobile during this phase, leading to increasing metal concentrations in the leachate.

Methane fermentation (Phase IV)

The acid formation phase intermediary products (e.g., acetic, propionic, and butyric acids) are converted to CH4 and CO2 by methanogenic microorganisms. As VFAs are metabolized by the methanogens, the landfill water pH returns to neutrality. The leachate's organic strength, expressed as oxygen demand, decreases at a rapid rate with increases in CH4 and CO2 gas production. This is the longest decomposition phase.

Final maturation and stabilization (Phase V)

The rate of microbiological activity slows during the last phase of waste decomposition as the supply of nutrients limits the chemical reactions, e.g. as bioavailable phosphorus becomes increasingly scarce. CH4 production almost completely disappears, with O2 and oxidized species gradually reappearing in the gas wells as O2 permeates downwardly from the troposphere. This transforms the oxidation–reduction potential (ORP) in the leachate toward oxidative processes. The residual organic materials may incrementally be converted to the gas phase, and as organic matter is composted; i.e. the organic matter is converted to humic-like compounds.

Social and environmental impact

Landfills have the potential to cause a number of issues. Infrastructure disruption, such as damage to access roads by heavy vehicles, may occur. Pollution of local roads and watercourses from wheels on vehicles when they leave the landfill can be significant and can be mitigated by wheel washing systems. Pollution of the local environment, such as contamination of groundwater or aquifers or soil contamination may occur, as well.

Leachate 

When precipitation falls on open landfills, water percolates through the garbage and becomes contaminated with suspended and dissolved material, forming leachate. If this is not contained it can contaminate groundwater. All modern landfill sites use a combination of impermeable liners several metres thick, geologically stable sites and collection systems to contain and capture this leachate. It can then be treated and evaporated. Once a landfill site is full, it is sealed off to prevent precipitation ingress and new leachate formation. However, liners must have a lifespan, be it several hundred years or more. Eventually, any landfill liner could leak, so the ground around landfills must be tested for leachate to prevent pollutants from contaminating groundwater.

Decomposition gases 

Rotting food and other decaying organic waste create decomposition gases, especially CO2 and CH4 from aerobic and anaerobic decomposition, respectively. Both processes occur simultaneously in different parts of a landfill. In addition to available O2, the fraction of gas constituents will vary, depending on the age of landfill, type of waste, moisture content and other factors. For example, the maximum amount of landfill gas produced can be illustrated a simplified net reaction of diethyl oxalate that accounts for these simultaneous reactions:

4 C6H10O4 + 6 H2O → 13 CH4 + 11 CO2

On average, about half of the volumetric concentration of landfill gas is CH4 and slightly less than half is CO2. The gas also contains about 5% molecular nitrogen (N2), less than 1% hydrogen sulfide (H2S), and a low concentration of non-methane organic compounds (NMOC), about 2700 ppmv.

Landfill gases can seep out of the landfill and into the surrounding air and soil. Methane is a greenhouse gas, and is flammable and potentially explosive at certain concentrations, which makes it perfect for burning to generate electricity cleanly. Since decomposing plant matter and food waste only release carbon that has been captured from the atmosphere through photosynthesis, no new carbon enters the carbon cycle and the atmospheric concentration of CO2 is not affected. Carbon dioxide traps heat in the atmosphere, contributing to climate change. In properly managed landfills, gas is collected and flared or recovered for landfill gas utilization.

Vectors 
Poorly run landfills may become nuisances because of vectors such as rats and flies which can spread infectious diseases. The occurrence of such vectors can be mitigated through the use of daily cover.

Other nuisances 

Other potential issues include wildlife disruption due to occupation of habitat and animal health disruption caused by consuming waste from landfills, dust, odor, noise pollution, and reduced local property values.

Landfill gas

Gases are produced in landfills due to the anaerobic digestion by microbes. In a properly managed landfill this gas is collected and used. Its uses range from simple flaring to the landfill gas utilization and generation of electricity. Landfill gas monitoring alerts workers to the presence of a build-up of gases to a harmful level. In some countries, landfill gas recovery is extensive; in the United States, for example, more than 850 landfills have active landfill gas recovery systems.

Regional practice

Canada
Landfills in Canada are regulated by provincial environmental agencies and environmental protection legislation.
Older facilities tend to fall under current standards and are monitored for leaching. Some former locations have been converted to parkland.

European Union
In the European Union, individual states are obliged to enact legislation to comply with the requirements and obligations of the European Landfill Directive.

The majority of EU member states have laws banning or severely restricting the disposal of household trash via landfills.

India 
Landfilling is currently the major method of municipal waste disposal in India. India also has Asia's largest dumping ground in Deonar, Mumbai. However issues frequently arise due alarming growth rate of landfills and poor management by authorities. On and under surface fires have been commonly seen in the Indian landfills over the last few years.

United Kingdom 

Landfilling practices in the UK have had to change in recent years to meet the challenges of the European Landfill Directive. The UK now imposes landfill tax upon biodegradable waste which is put into landfills. In addition to this the Landfill Allowance Trading Scheme has been established for local authorities to trade landfill quotas in England. A different system operates in Wales where authorities cannot 'trade' amongst themselves, but have allowances known as the Landfill Allowance Scheme.

United States

U.S. landfills are regulated by each state's environmental agency, which establishes minimum guidelines; however, none of these standards may fall below those set by the United States Environmental Protection Agency (EPA).

Permitting a landfill generally takes between five and seven years, costs millions of dollars and requires rigorous siting, engineering and environmental studies and demonstrations to ensure local environmental and safety concerns are satisfied.

Types 
 Municipal solid waste: takes in household waste and nonhazardous material. Included in this type of landfill is a Bioreactor Landfill that specifically degrades organic material.
 Industrial waste: for commercial and industrial waste. Other related landfills include Construction and Demolition Debris Landfills and Coal Combustion Residual Landfills.
 Hazardous waste or PCB waste: Polychlorinated Biphenyl (PCB) landfills that are monitored in the United States by the Toxic Substances Control Act of 1976 (TSCA).

Microbial topics
The status of a landfill's microbial community may determine its digestive efficiency.

Bacteria that digest plastic have been found in landfills.

Reclaiming materials

One can treat landfills as a viable and abundant source of materials and energy. In the developing world, waste pickers often scavenge for still-usable materials. In commercial contexts, companies have also discovered landfill sites, and many have begun harvesting materials and energy. Well-known examples include gas-recovery facilities.
Other commercial facilities include waste incinerators which have built-in material recovery. This material recovery is possible through the use of filters (electro filter, active-carbon and potassium filter, quench, HCl-washer, SO2-washer, bottom ash-grating, etc.).

Alternatives

In addition to waste reduction and recycling strategies, there are various alternatives to landfills, including waste-to-energy incineration, anaerobic digestion, composting, mechanical biological treatment, pyrolysis and plasma arc gasification. Depending on local economics and incentives, these can be made more financially attractive than landfills.

Restrictions

Countries including Germany, Austria, Sweden, Denmark, Belgium, the Netherlands, and Switzerland, have banned the disposal of untreated waste in landfills. In these countries, only certain hazardous wastes, fly ashes from incineration or the stabilized output of mechanical biological treatment plants may still be deposited.

See also

 Bioreactor landfill
 Daily cover
 Fly-tipping
 Hydrologic Evaluation of Landfill Performance (HELP) model
 Land reclamation
 Landfarming
 Landfill diversion
 Landfill restoration
 Landfill tax
 List of solid waste treatment technologies
 Marine debris
 Mechanical biological treatment
 Milorganite
 National Waste & Recycling Association
 NIMBY
 Open dump
 Recycling rates by country
 Sludge
 Solid Waste Association of North America
 Waste management
 Midden

References

Further reading
 
 
 
 
 Daniel A. Vallero, Environmental Biotechnology: A Biosystems Approach. 2nd Edition. Academic Press, Amsterdam, Netherlands and Boston MA, Print Book ; eBook . 2015.

External links

 US National Waste & Recycling Association
 Solid Waste Association of North America
 A Compact Guide to Landfill Operation: Machinery, Management and Misconceptions

 
Waste management